A cadence is a melodic or harmonic configuration that creates a sense of resolution.

Cadence may also refer to:

Arts and entertainment

Music
Cadence (vocal group), a Canadian a cappella quartet
Drum cadence, played exclusively by the percussion section of a marching band
Military cadence, a marching chant 
 Cadence, the high school band of Chris Daughtry

Record labels
Cadence Jazz Records, a record label associated with Cadence magazine
Cadence Records, a 1940s/1950s American record label during the 
Cadence Music Group, formerly MapleMusic Recordings, a Canadian record label

Other uses in arts and entertainment
Cadence (film), a 1990 film by Martin Sheen
Cadence (magazine), a quarterly review of jazz, blues and improvised music
Cadence (poetry), the fall in pitch of the intonation of the voice

Businesses
Cadence Bank, an American bank
Cadence Bank (1887–2021), a former company merged into this bank
Cadence Biomedical, an American medical device company 
Cadence Design Systems, an American company
Cadence Industries, an American conglomerate

People
Cadence (given name)

Other uses
Cadence (cycling), a measure of cycling speed
Cadence (gait), a measure of athletic performance

See also

Cadenza (disambiguation)
Cadence-lypso, a fusion of cadence and calypso dance music
Cadence rampa, a dance music